Mubi South is a Local Government Area of Adamawa State, Nigeria.it shares road boundary with mubi north.the major tribes in mubi south include,Gude,Njenyi, Fali, Fulani mubi south Has 101 polling units.

See also
 Mubi

Local Government Areas in Adamawa State